Gaius Luccius Telesinus was a Roman senator who was active during the first century CE. He was ordinary consul for the year 66 with Gaius Suetonius Paulinus as his colleague. In Philostratus' Life of Apollonius, Telesinus had been depicted as a pious consul conversing with Apollonius of Tyana. He allows Apollonius entry into Rome's temples, his residence there, and adoption of Apollonius' reforms by the temples. According to Philostratus, Telesinus continued to study philosophy under Apollonius.

Inscriptions

RMD III 2016

References

Imperial Roman consuls
1st-century Romans